Church of the Holy Apostles was a Serbian Orthodox Church located in the village of Petrovac, Kamenica, Kosovo. It belonged to the Diocese of Raška and Prizren of the Serbian Orthodox Church.

The destruction of the church in 1999
Shortly after the arrival of the US KFOR troops, the church was vandalized and destroyed by Albanian extremists.

References

External links
 The list of destroyed and desecrated churches in Kosovo and Metohija June-October 1999 (Списак уништених и оскрнављених цркава на Косову и Метохији јун-октобар 1999)

Serbian Orthodox church buildings in Kosovo
Destroyed churches in Kosovo
Former Serbian Orthodox churches
Persecution of Serbs
Buildings and structures in Gjilan
Cultural heritage of Kosovo